The Republican-American is a conservative-leaning, family-owned newspaper based in Waterbury, Connecticut established in 1990 through merger of two newspapers under the same ownership: Waterbury American and Waterbury Republican.  The publication's origins date back to 1844.

Circulation 
Three dozen communities in New Haven and Litchfield counties receive the newspaper, among them being:  Greater Waterbury, the Naugatuck Valley, and Litchfield County, and include Ansonia, Beacon Falls, Bethlehem, Bridgewater, Canaan, Cheshire, Colebrook, Cornwall, Falls Village, Goshen, Harwinton, Kent, Litchfield, Middlebury, Morris, Naugatuck, New Hartford, New Milford, North Canaan, Oxford, Plymouth, Prospect, Roxbury, Salisbury, Seymour, Sharon, Southbury, Terryville, Thomaston, Torrington, Warren, Washington, Waterbury, Watertown, Winchester, Winsted, Wolcott, and Woodbury.

History 
The Republican-American is a direct descendant of two other newspapers which went through a series of ownership and content changes since the mid-1800s.

The Waterbury American started in 1844 as a weekly paper published by Josiah Giles.  Twenty-two years later, in 1866, it started publication as a daily newspaper.

The Waterbury Republican started in 1881 as a weekly paper published by John Henry Morrow.  By 1884, it had transitioned to a daily newspaper.  The paper changed hands in 1901 when William Jamieson Pape and William M. Lathrop purchased it together.

Pape became the sole owner of the Waterbury Republican in 1910, and in 1922 purchased the Waterbury American.  Ownership of both papers has been retained in the Pape family until the present day, with the decision to merge them to form the Republican-American coming in 1990.

Editorial stance 
The Republican-American describes itself as having a socially and fiscally conservative editorial stance. It advocates what it considers to be pro-business government policies, such as tax cuts and regulatory reform. The Republican-American claims that it is "quick to blow the whistle on what it views as wasteful use of tax dollars, as well as what it sees as unnecessary growth of local, state or federal government".  The newspaper is a frequent critic of the demands of organized labor, especially public-employee unions, arguing they compel governments and businesses to spend beyond their means.

The paper advocates for a more interventionist approach to foreign policy, asserting that "if the U.S. is not quick to forcefully denounce and, if necessary, take action against, aggressive and anti-democratic actions by anti-American regimes and groups, America’s enemies will be emboldened".

Owing to its editorial stance, the Republican-American typically endorses Republican candidates for office. The paper endorsed Bob Stefanowski in the 2022 and 2018 Connecticut gubernatorial elections.

The Republican-American has often labeled Democratic officials and candidates as communists or socialists, and the paper's editorial board has been criticized by newspaper trade publication Editor & Publisher for "McCarthyism" and "red-baiting". The editorial board of the Republican-American has accused former Senator Chris Dodd of being "chief apologist for the communist tyrants", Senate candidate Ned Lamont of being a Stalinist, and claimed "Marxists-Socialists" control the Democratic Party.

The paper's editorial board attracted widescale attention and condemnation after publishing a piece titled "Is New Orleans Worth Reclaiming?", following the impact of Hurricane Katrina.

Controversies 
The newspaper trade publication Editor & Publisher heavily criticized the Republican-American in an August 2006 piece. The publication highlighted an editorial the Republican-American wrote on then-candidate for U.S. Senate Ned Lamont, which called Lamont and his family communists. Editor & Publisher rebuked the piece for being "rife with errors", including calling famous American financier J.P. Morgan "the sugar daddy for the American Communist Party and other extreme left-wing organizations".

The Republican-American faced nationwide scorn for August 2005 editorial, "Is New Orleans Worth Reclaiming?", which called for the abandonment of New Orleans following Hurricane Katrina. The New Orleans Times-Picayune responded to the Republican-American in an editorial titled "Yes, We're Worth It", labeling the paper "heartless" and asking "How dare they?".

Accolades 

Four editors and reporters have been elected to the New England Academy of Journalists.

References

Notes

External links
 

Waterbury, Connecticut
Newspapers published in Connecticut
Pulitzer Prize-winning newspapers
Mass media in New Haven County, Connecticut
Publications established in 1844
1844 establishments in Connecticut
Publications established in 1881
1881 establishments in Connecticut
Pulitzer Prize for Public Service winners